George Gardner (1810, Ardentinny – 1849, Kandy) was a Scottish biologist mainly interested in  botany.
 
Gardner's father was a gardener first to the Earl of Dunmore in  Ardentinny, then from 1816 to the Earl of Eglinton at Ardrossan. In 1822, his parents moved to Glasgow where he attended the grammar-school and  acquired a good knowledge of the Latin language. He began the study of medicine in the Andersonian university of Glasgow in 1829, eventually becoming a surgeon.

In 1836, encouraged by the famed botanist William Jackson Hooker, he brought out a work entitled Musci Britannici, or Pocket Herbarium of British Mosses arranged and named according to Hooker’s "British Flora". His botanical work impressed John Russell, 6th Duke of Bedford who became his patron. In the summer of 1836 Gardner sailed from Liverpool for Rio de Janeiro, to collect natural history specimens in North Brazil, including plants, minerals, recent and fossil shells, preserved skins of birds, mammals and fishes. The specimens were sent to public botanic gardens, as well as to private subscribers to the expedition. He stayed in Brazil for years (1836–1841). In 1842 he was elected a Member of the Linnean Society.

In 1843, the colonial government of Ceylon appointed him as superintendent of the botanic garden in Peradeniya and island botanist. Here he finished Travels in the Interior of Brazil, principally through the Northern Provinces and the Gold Districts, during the years 1836–41, which was published in London by Reeves Brothers in 1846. He had also made extensive collections in Ceylon towards a complete Flora Zeylanica, but this was not published because of his early death.

References

Torrington, 1849. Death of George Gardner. Hooker's J. Bot. Kew Gard. Misc . 1: 154–156.
Ray Desmond, 1994. Dictionary of British and Irish Botanists and Horticulturists including Plant Collectors, Flower Painters and Garden Designers, p. 270. Taylor & Francis and The Natural History Museum (London).

External links
 Gardner, George. 1846. Travels in the interior of Brazil: principally through the northern provinces, and the gold and diamond districts, during the years 1836-1841. London: Reeve, Brothers.
George Gardner: plant pioneer in Brazil Web resource from the Royal Botanic Gardens, Kew, including biographical details, travel accounts and details of his botanical collections.
Significant Scots Text from Biographical Dictionary of Eminent Scotsmen Blackie and Son of Glasgow, Edinburgh, and London 1856.

Scottish botanists
Scottish entomologists
People from Kandy
Sri Lankan botanists
Sri Lankan entomologists
People from British Ceylon
1849 deaths
1810 births
Sri Lankan environmentalists
Fellows of the Linnean Society of London